ISO 3166-2:DO is the entry for the Dominican Republic in ISO 3166-2, part of the ISO 3166 standard published by the International Organization for Standardization (ISO), which defines codes for the names of the principal subdivisions (e.g., provinces or states) of all countries coded in ISO 3166-1.

Currently for the Dominican Republic, ISO 3166-2 codes are defined for 10 regions, 31 provinces and 1 district. The Distrito Nacional contains the capital of the country Santo Domingo and has special status equal to the provinces.

Each code consists of two parts, separated by a hyphen. The second part is two digits:
 01: district
 02–27: provinces as of late 1970s
 28–30: provinces created in the 1980s and 1990s
 31–32: provinces created in 2001 and 2002
 33–42: regions

Current codes
Subdivision names are listed as in the ISO 3166-2 standard published by the ISO 3166 Maintenance Agency (ISO 3166/MA).

Click on the button in the header to sort each column.

Regions

Provinces and district

Changes
The following changes to the entry have been announced in newsletters by the ISO 3166/MA since the first publication of ISO 3166-2 in 1998. ISO stopped issuing newsletters in 2013.

The following changes to the entry are listed on ISO's online catalogue, the Online Browsing Platform:

Codes changed in Newsletter I-1
Note: Two provinces were assigned the code .

See also
 Subdivisions of the Dominican Republic
 FIPS region codes of the Dominican Republic

References

External links
 ISO Online Browsing Platform: DO
 Provinces of the Dominican Republic, Statoids.com

2:DO
ISO 3166-2
Dominican Republic geography-related lists